Zhang Li (3 May 1951 – 13 February 2019) was a female international table tennis player from China.

Table tennis career
From 1973 to 1979 she won ten medals in the World Table Tennis Championships and several medals in the Asian Table Tennis Championships.

The ten World Championship medals included four gold medals; one in the singles at the 1979 World Table Tennis Championships with Zhang Deying and three more in the Corbillon Cup (team event) for China.

Personal life
After retiring from competition, Zhang and her husband Li Zhenshi moved to the US, where they directed the World Champions Table Tennis Academy in San Jose, California. She died on 13 February 2019.

References

1951 births
2019 deaths
Chinese female table tennis players
Asian Games medalists in table tennis
Table tennis players at the 1974 Asian Games
Table tennis players at the 1978 Asian Games
Medalists at the 1974 Asian Games
Medalists at the 1978 Asian Games
Asian Games gold medalists for China
People from Xinxiang
Table tennis players from Henan